Petrel (also spelled Petrell) is an unincorporated community in Fairbanks Township, Saint Louis County, Minnesota, United States; located within the Superior National Forest.

The community is located east of Fairbanks, and north of Brimson, near the intersection of Saint Louis County Highway 44 and County Road 353, Little Creek Road.

The junction of County Highway 44 and County Highway 16 is nearby.

Petrel is located near the boundary line for Saint Louis and Lake counties.

References

Unincorporated communities in Minnesota
Unincorporated communities in St. Louis County, Minnesota